was a feudal domain in Edo period Japan, located in  Dewa Province (modern-day Akita Prefecture), Japan.  It was centered on Yashima Jin'ya in the former town of Yashima, Akita, in what is now part of the city of Yurihonjō, Akita.

History
The Ikoma clan was originally a powerful 171,800-koku daimyō clan ruling Takamatsu Domain in Sanuki Province. However, the Ikoma were dispossessed in 1640 due to gross mismanagement by Ikoma Takatoshi which resulted in an O-Ie Sōdō by his retainers. The Tokugawa shogunate reassigned the clan to the newly created 10,000 koku Yashima Domain in the inhospitable foothills of Mount Chōkai in central Dewa Province, where Ikoma Takatoshi was ordered to remain under house arrest for over 20 years. Furthermore, in 1659 his son and heir Ikoma Takakiyo was forced to divide 2000 koku of his inheritance to a younger brother, and thus the clan lost its status as a daimyō  clan, and was reduced to the ranks of the hatamoto.

Forced to reside in Edo, the Ikoma administered their territory as absentee landlords through local administrator; however, the high taxation and tyranny of the administrators led to repeated peasant uprisings and eventually a direct appeal by the peasants to the government, especially in 1677. In 1780, shōgun Tokugawa Ieharu allowed the head of the clan to visit his holdings under the sankin-kōtai system. 
 
During the Boshin War, the Ikoma clan initially signed the Ōuetsu Reppan Dōmei agreement, but quickly switched sides on the approach of the forces of pro-Imperial Shinjō Domain. The new Meiji government rewarded the Ikoma for their quick defection from the Ōuetsu Reppan Dōmei in 1868 with an increase in revenues to 15,200 koku, restoring the clan to the ranks of the daimyo after 250 years. The new Yashima Domain was rewarded a further 1,000 koku in 1869, with control of 47 villages in what became Yuri District, Akita. 

However, with the abolition of the han system in July 1871, Yashima Domain was absorbed into Akita Prefecture.  In 1884, the adopted son of the final daimyo was granted the title of baron (danshaku) in the kazoku peerage.

List of daimyōs 
  Ikoma clan (tozama) 1640–1658; 1868–1871

Further reading

Sasaki Suguru (2004). Boshin Sensō 戊辰戦争. Tokyo: Chuokōron-shinsha.

Domains of Japan
History of Akita Prefecture
1640 establishments in Japan
1871 disestablishments in Japan
States and territories disestablished in 1871
Dewa Province
Ōuetsu Reppan Dōmei